Ellis bridge is an area located in Ahmedabad, India.

About

Ellis Bridge area is located along the sides of Sabarmati river. It was the first area developed outside walled city on the west bank of Sabarmati river. It is an amalgam of residential settlements, hospitals, and educational institutions. V.S. Hospital (Vadilal Sarabhai) set here. Among the educational institutes, Gujarat College, Gujarat Institute of civil Engineers and Architects and Law College are here. A large number of schools are also situated here along the sides of Sabarmati river. Hotels like The Westend, Radisson Hotel, Inder Residency, Hotel Shalin Suites, Hotel Nalanda, Hotel Chicago provide accommodation. Local attractions include Law garden and Lalbhai Dalpatbhai Institute of Indology. M J Library is one of the major library of the city. Ellis Bridge Gymkhana and Oriental Club are recreational clubs here.

References

Neighbourhoods in Ahmedabad